Henry Prittie, 2nd Baron Dunalley (3 March 1775 – 19 October 1854) was an Anglo-Irish politician.

Dunalley was the son of Henry Prittie, 1st Baron Dunalley, by Catherine Sadleir, daughter of Francis Sadleir and widow of John Bury. Charles Bury, 1st Earl of Charleville, was Dunalley's half-brother. He was elected to the Irish House of Commons for Carlow Borough in 1798, a seat he held until the Irish Parliament was abolished in 1801. The same year he succeeded his father as second Baron Dunalley, but as this was an Irish peerage it did not entitle him to an automatic seat in the British House of Lords. In 1819 Dunalley became a Member of Parliament (MP) in the British House of Commons for Okehampton, and represented this constituency until 1824. He was elected an Irish Representative Peer in 1828, and sat in the House of Lords until his death.

Lord Dunalley married, firstly, Maria Trant, daughter of Dominick Trant, in 1802. After his first wife's death in 1819, he married, secondly, Hon. Emily Maude, daughter of Cornwallis Maude, 1st Viscount Hawarden, in 1826. Lord Dunalley died in October 1854, aged 79. Both his marriages were childless and he was succeeded in the barony by his nephew Henry Prittie.

References

Kidd, Charles, Williamson, David (editors). Debrett's Peerage and Baronetage (1990 edition). New York: St Martin's Press, 1990, 

1775 births
1854 deaths
Barons in the Peerage of Ireland
Prittie, Henry Sadleir
Prittie, Henry Sadleir
Prittie, Henry Sadleir
Prittie, Henry Sadleir
Prittie, Henry Sadleir
Prittie, Henry Sadleir
Prittie, Henry Sadleir
UK MPs who inherited peerages
Irish representative peers